The 2012–13 First League of the Republika Srpska is the eighteenth season of the First League of the Republika Srpska, the second tier football league of Bosnia and Herzegovina, since its original establishment and the eleventh as a second-tier league. It will begin on 11 August 2012 and end on 25 May 2013; a winter break where no matches are played will be in effect between 3 November 2012 and 9 March 2013. Radnik were the last champions, having won their third championship title in the 2011–12 season and earning a promotion to Premier League of Bosnia and Herzegovina. This year Mladost Velika Obarska won the championship, the first time they won the First League of the Republika Srpska.

Fourteen clubs are participating in this session, ten returning from the previous session, one relegated from Premier League of Bosnia and Herzegovina, two promoted from two regional Second League of the Republika Srpska and one as a replacement for Crvena Zemlja who withdraw from the competition due to financial difficulties.

Changes from last season

Team changes

From First League of the RS
Promoted to Premier League
 Radnik

Relegated to one of 2 respective regional Second League of the RS
 FK Laktaši (Second League of the RS – West)
 Proleter (Second League of the RS – West)

To First League of RS
Relegated from Premier League

 Kozara
Promoted from two regional Second League of the RS
 Borac (Š) (Second League of the RS – West)
 Mladost (VO) (Second League of the RS – East)

Stadions and locations

Personnel and kits

Note: Flags indicate national team as has been defined under FIFA eligibility rules. Players may hold more than one non-FIFA nationality.

Managerial changes

Season events

FK Crvena Zemlja withdrawal
On 17 July 2012, Crvena Zemlja announced that they will withdraw from the First League of the Republika Srpska due to financial difficulties. There were many proposals who should replace them, but in the end, Ljubić were placed as the replacement. They finished fourth in 2011–12 Second League of the Republika Srpska - West.

League table

Positions by round

Results

Clubs season-progress

Season statistics

Transfers
For the list of transfers involving First League clubs during 2012–13 season, please see: List of Bosnia and Herzegovina football transfers summer 2012 and List of Bosnia and Herzegovina football transfers winter 2012–13.

Top goalscorers
Updated 25 May 2013.

Hat-tricks
Updated 24 March 2013.

See also
2011–12 First League of the Republika Srpska
2012–13 Republika Srpska Cup
2012–13 Second League of the Republika Srpska
2012–13 First League of the Federation of Bosnia and Herzegovina
2012–13 Premier League of Bosnia and Herzegovina
2012–13 Bosnia and Herzegovina Football Cup
Football Federation of Bosnia and Herzegovina

References

External links
Official site for the Football Federation of Bosnia and Herzegovina
Official site for the Football Federation of the Federation of Bosnia and Herzegovina
Official site for the Football Federation of the Republika of Srpska

Bos
2012–13 in Bosnia and Herzegovina football
First League of the Republika Srpska seasons